Wim Vandekeybus (Herenthout, 30 June 1963) is a Belgian choreographer, director and photographer. His company Ultima Vez is located in Sint-Jans-Molenbeek (Brussels).
Together with Jan Fabre, Alain Platel and Anne Teresa De Keersmaeker, Wim Vandekeybus has been responsible for the Flemish Wave in contemporary dance in the 80's. He made over thirty international dance and theater productions and almost as many movies and video works.

Breakthrough 
After graduating high school, he briefly studied Psychology in KU Leuven in Leuven, Belgium. But later on, however, he decided to pursue a different path. After a workshop with Paul Peyskens he came in contact with theater. He followed through with various dance workshops (including tango and contemporary dance) and focused on film and photography.

After auditioning for Jan Fabre’s The Power of Theatrical Madness in 1985, Wim Vandekeybus spent two years travelling the world as one of the play’s two naked kings. In 1986 he withdrew to Madrid for several months with a group of novice dancers to work on his first show and to launch his company Ultima Vez.

His first show What the Body Does Not Remember premiered in June 1987 at the Toneelschuur in Haarlem (the Netherlands). The music driving the dancers was composed by Thierry De Mey and Peter Vermeersch. The performance won a Bessie Award in 1988 in New York.

A residency in 1989 at the Centre National de Danse Contemporaine d'Angers resulted in Les porteuses de mauvaises nouvelles, which earned Vandekeybus a second Bessie Award.

Vandekeybus' signature 
Although Vandekeybus' signature resides first and foremost in the physical material, Ultima Vez’ early shows already reveal the rudimentary outlines of a narrative, for example in the opposition between men and women. How people react in unfamiliar situations or marginal positions has always fascinated Vandekeybus. He has often sought to collaborate with other artists but also to work with non-artists as well as with dancers and performers of all ages and from a range of backgrounds.

Vandekeybus’ search for novelty and innovation is a constant in his work, but throughout his very different productions he has always remained true to the idiom of movement. Key elements of his oeuvre are tension and conflict, the body/mind dichotomy, risks and impulses as well as physicality, passion, intuition and instinct. However, each element is tackled differently in his shows.

Performances

Filmography

Awards 
 In 1988 Wim Vandekeybus receives a Bessie Award for What the Body Does Not Remember
 In 1990 Wim Vandekeybus receives a Bessie Award for Les Porteuses de mauvaises nouvelles
 In 2007 Wim Vandekeybus receives the Choreography Media Honor of the Directors Guild of America in Los Angeles
 Keizer Karel prize (2012)
 Evens Arts Prize (2013)

References

External links
 
 
 Ultima Vez official Instagram]

1963 births
Living people
Belgian choreographers
Belgian male dancers
Belgian film directors